Komuna e Parisit (Paris Commune) is an Albanian sitcom, written by Erand Sojli and directed by Altin Basha. The series started on November 2, 2009 and finished in 2010.

Plot 
Set in "Komuna e Parisit", a street in Tirana, the series shows the life of a group of students who live in this street.

References 

2009 Albanian television series debuts
2010 Albanian television series endings
Albanian television shows
Top Channel original programming